The 2012 Dothan Pro Tennis Classic was a professional tennis tournament played on clay courts. It was the twelfth edition of the tournament which was part of the 2012 ITF Women's Circuit, offering a total of $50,000 in prize money. It took place in Dothan, Alabama, United States, on April 16–22, 2012.

WTA entrants

Seeds 

 1 Rankings are as of April 9, 2012

Other entrants 
The following players received wildcards into the singles main draw:
  Whitney Jones
  Madison Keys
  Melanie Oudin
  Jessica Pegula

The following players received entry from the qualifying draw:
  Sharon Fichman
  Sacha Jones
  Maria Sanchez
  Valeria Solovyeva

The following players received entry by a junior exempt:
  Eugenie Bouchard

Champions

Singles 

  Camila Giorgi def.  Edina Gallovits-Hall, 6–2, 4–6, 6–4

Doubles 

 Eugenie Bouchard /  Jessica Pegula def.  Sharon Fichman /  Marie-Ève Pelletier, 6–4, 4–6, [10–5]

External links 
 Official website

Dothan Pro Tennis Classic
Hardee's Pro Classic